Dora the Explorer is an animated children's television series.

Dora the Explorer may also refer to:

Dora the Explorer: Journey to the Purple Planet a 2005 action-adventure video game
Dora and the Lost City of Gold, a 2019 live-action comedy adventure film
"Dora the Explora", a song by Pink Guy from the album Pink Season
"Dora the Female Explorer", a song by Stackridge from the album of the same name

See also